Hideya Sugio is a Japanese politician who is a member of the House of Councillors of Japan.

Biography 
He graduated from Tokyo University in 1981, and worked for Tokyo Broadcasting System and Japan News Network before entering politics.

he had announced his candidacy on January 11, 2016.
In 2020, he and Hiroyuki Konishi failed a lawsuit for defamation demanding internet providers and others who may provide the identity behind the Twitter user known as "Dappi".

References 

Living people
Members of the House of Councillors (Japan)
1957 births